9 Luas (Portuguese for 9 Moons) is the eighth studio album by Brazilian rock band Os Paralamas do Sucesso, released in 1996. With this album, the Paralamas definitely abandon their previous new wave/ska/reggae rock style and adopt a more pop rock sonority, however without abandoning the Latino influences.

Main hits of this album include "Lourinha Bombril", "Capitão de Indústria", "Busca Vida", "O Caminho Pisado", "La Bella Luna" and "O Caroço da Cabeça" (previously recorded by Titãs and released in their 1995 album Domingo).

The song "De Música Ligeira" is a Portuguese-language cover of "De Música Ligera", originally by Argentine band Soda Stereo.

Track listing

Personnel
 Bi Ribeiro — bass
 Herbert Vianna — guitar, vocals
 João Barone — drums, percussion

References

1996 albums
Os Paralamas do Sucesso albums
EMI Records albums